The Alberg 29 is a Canadian sailboat that was designed by Carl Alberg as racer-cruiser and first built in 1976.

The Alberg 29 is a refinement of the 1962 Alberg 30 concept.

Production
The design was built by Nye Yachts in Belleville, Ontario, Canada. The company built 80 examples between 1976 and 1985, but it is now out of production.

Design
The Alberg 29 is a recreational keelboat, built predominantly of fibreglass, with wood trim. It has a masthead sloop rig, a slightly spooned raked stem, a raised transom, a keel-mounted rudder controlled by a wheel and a fixed long keel, cutaway forward. It displaces  and carries  of lead ballast.

The boat's galley is located on the starboard side of the cabin, at the bottom of the companionway steps. It has a stainless steel sink and a two-burner propane stove. The head has a privacy door and is located forward on the port side, just aft of the bow "V"-berth, with the sink opposite, on the starboard side. Additional sleeping space is provided in the cabin, by the dinette settee, which has a fixed table and a single berth to starboard. The trim is teak, with the cabin sole teak and holly. A shower was a factory option. The design has  of headroom below decks.

Ventilation is provided by a plexiglass forward hatch and six opening ports, while a further four ports are fixed.

The boat has genoa and jib tracks and four cockpit winches, plus bronze cleats and blocks. There is an anchor locker in the bow.

The design has a PHRF racing average handicap of 222.

Operational history
In a review Michael McGoldrick wrote, "In many ways, the Alberg 29 is the refinement and culmination of the concept behind the original Alberg 30. It has a slightly more modern look about it. Like the older Alberg 30, this boat has a full keel and places a high priority on seaworthiness. The cleats, portholes, and other equipment are robust and indicate that the Alberg 29 was designed for bluewater cruising. Despite its full keel design, owners report that when the wind picks up, the Alberg 29 can point quite high and has a good turn of speed."

In a review Richard Sherwood wrote, "While the Alberg 29 has a full keel, it is not long. The bow and counter combine to give a short, 22-foot 3-inch waterline. The bow is fine, the keel cut away. Bilges are firm, and the wide beam gives stability. Like other full-keel boats, she tracks well. The rig is high aspect and there is a large foretriangle for windward performance."

See also
List of sailing boat types

Related development
Alberg 30

Similar sailboats
Bayfield 29 
C&C 29
Cal 29
Hunter 290
Island Packet 29
Mirage 29
Northwind 29
Prospect 900
Tanzer 29
Thames Marine Mirage 29
Watkins 29

References

Keelboats
1970s sailboat type designs
Sailing yachts
Sailboat types built in Canada
Sailboat type designs by Carl Alberg
Sailboat types built by Nye Yachts